Idzbark  is a village in the administrative district of Gmina Ostróda, within Ostróda County, Warmian-Masurian Voivodeship, in northern Poland.

The village has an approximate population of 500.

References

Idzbark